Fifi and the Flowertots is a British stop-motion children's television series created by Keith Chapman (who also created the Bob the Builder series) for Five and Nick Jr. It aired from 2 May 2005 to 16 July 2010. Chapman Entertainment produced the show, which was animated by Cosgrove Hall Films. 

The series featured a group of flower-based characters doing their activities and adventures through the garden. Fifi Forget-Me-Not (the title character and hostess) and Primrose were voiced by Jane Horrocks, while the other characters were voiced by Maria Darling, Tim Whitnall, Marc Silk, and John Thomson. The music is produced by Alan Coates and Kim Goody. Who worked on Tiny Planets.

Characters
 Fifi Forget-Me-Not (voiced by Jane Horrocks in the UK and Fran Brill in the US) is the cheerful hostess of the series and a forget-me-not. She says hello at the beginning of each episode and at the end she says goodbye and promises to come back soon, sometimes, anytime, another time, another day or maybe next time. When she forgets what to do, she says: "Fiddly Flowerpetals!" before describing the problem for the audience to guess, and when she remembers, another character says: "Fifi Forget-Me-Not forgot!", while her catchphrase, sometimes, when she forgets what to do is "Buttercups and Daisies!" and when something is wrong she says: "Diggly Dandelions!". She likes to cook and look after plants and lives in a watering can house.
 Aunt Tulip (voiced by Tim Whitnall in the UK and Karen Prell in the US) is Fifi's aunt. She likes to have tea parties and chats with the Flowertots. She lives in a pineapple house and has a pet grub named Grubby, which is very little and often gets lost. Her catchphrase is "Sweet Potatoes!"
Buttercup (voiced by Joanna Ruiz in the UK and US) is a buttercup. She lives in a "Milk Bucket House" with her twin sister Daisy and has a mouse called Cornflower because of his lovely blue colour.
Daisy (voiced by Janet James in the UK and US) is a daisy. She is shy and dreamy, as similar to her twin sister Buttercup. She is a little bit clumsy, though. She likes her comfort duckling toy called "Diddyduck".
Poppy (Poppady in the US) (voiced by Maria Darling in the UK and Alice Dinnean in the US) is a poppy who is Fifi's friend. She has a market stall where she sells everything that the Flowertots need for each episode. Lives in a pumpkin house.
Primrose (voiced by Jane Horrocks in the UK and Zelda Williams in the US) is a primrose and Fifi's friend. She is prim and doesn't like getting messy, always wanting to look magnificent and getting upset when something goes wrong for her. She likes to create apparel for herself and tries to dress Fifi up. Her catchphrase is "I am NOT having a good day!"
Violet (voiced by Maria Darling in the UK and Nancy Cartwright in the US) is a violet and Fifi's other friend. She is very creative and loves painting. Violet lives with Primrose in a marrow house.
 Pip Gooseberry (voiced by Maria Darling in the UK and BJ Ward in the US) is a gooseberry and the youngest of the Flowertots. He likes to help Fifi and Bumble/Fuzzbuzz in the garden while he is, sometimes, too noisy and gets too excited. Fifi looks after him when Stingo and Slugsy play tricks on him. He lives in the gooseberry bushes on his playground.
Bumble (Fuzzbuzz in the US) (voiced by Marc Silk in the UK and Paul Greenberg in the US) is a good-natured bumblebee and Fifi's best friend. He often visits her and is always ready to come to her rescue but isn't good at landing and usually crashes. His catchphrase is "Wiggly Worms!".
 Stingo (voiced by Tim Whitnall in the UK and Jess Harnell in the US) is a short-tempered wasp who causes trouble for the Flowertots. He tries to steal food such as cake, blueberries, and chocolate, though. He lives in a red apple house. His catchphrase is "Rotten Raspberries!".
Slugsy (voiced by Marc Silk in the UK and Martin P. Robinson in the US) is a simple-minded slug and Stingo's sidekick. He is always ready to help Stingo but is very slow and often accidentally ruins Stingo's plans. He has a crush on Primrose but doesn't want to admit it. He lives at the top of Stingo's house. He speaks with a lisp.
 Flutterby (voiced by Tim Whitnall in the UK and Jerry Nelson in the US) is a butterfly. He takes Buttercup and Daisy around the garden and has a landing pad near the girls' house.
 Webby (voiced by Maria Darling in the UK and Susanne Blakeslee in the US) is a spider. She is the eldest and the wisest in Flowertot Garden. The Flowertots ask her for advice and help; however, Stingo and Slugsy avoid her so as not to hit the web she was spinning. Meanwhile, others consider her "so-called" as she lives in a web house.
 Mo is Fifi's lawnmower, which takes the harvest and the Flowertots around the garden.
 Diggly (voiced by Nick Wilson in the UK and US) is a grumpy but funny worm. He lives on the compost heap and eats scraps but prefers pumpkin pies.
 Hornetto (voiced by Tim Whitnall in the UK and Dan Povenmire in the US) is a hornet with a italian accent. He is Stingo's cousin, his voice sounds like Mr. Carburettor from Roary the Racing Car in the UK and Dr. Heinz Doofenshmirtz from Phineas and Ferb in the US.

Episodes

Series 1 (2005)

Series 2 (2006)

Series 3 (2010)

References

External links
Fifi and The Flowertots official site 
Fifi and The Flowertots on Nick Jr. UK

Television series by Universal Television
2000s British animated television series
2000s British children's television series
2005 British television series debuts
2010 British television series endings
2000s preschool education television series
Animated preschool education television series
British children's animated comedy television series
British children's animated fantasy television series
British educational television series
British preschool education television series
British stop-motion animated television series
Channel 5 (British TV channel) original programming
Clay animation television series
English-language television shows
Nick Jr. original programming
S4C original programming
Television series by Cosgrove Hall Films
Treehouse TV original programming